XHOD-FM is a radio station on 96.9 FM in San Luis Potosí, San Luis Potosí, Mexico. It is owned by GlobalMedia.

History

XHOD received its concession on September 22, 1971; while it got its concession two days after XHOB-FM 96.1, it is considered the first FM radio station in the state. It was owned by María Estela Martínez. The original format was known as OD 96.9, Otra Dimensión en Radio. Within several years, station manager Elías Navarro Martínez had affiliated to MVS Radio and the station picked up its FM Globo romantic format.

In San Luis Potosí, however, FM Globo mutated. XHOD became "Globo FM 96.9" and played as many as 70% songs in English, with a rock and pop-heavy format. In 2000, XHOD was converted to the new Exa FM format. 2009 saw the MVS stations in San Luis Potosí fall under the control of GlobalMedia.

In 2016, Exa FM moved to XHESL-FM while XHOD remained a pop station, calling itself "96.9". The temporary format was replaced on January 9, 2017, with the RMX rock format from Grupo Imagen. The format lasted just over 18 months, being replaced on August 4, 2018, with "Vox Love Station", airing romantic music; the Vox Love Station format was syndicated by Radiópolis.

On March 1, 2021, GlobalMedia dropped Vox Love Station for programming from El Heraldo Radio, though the station brands as GlobalMedia 96.9. After 3 weeks, on March 20, the Vox Love Station branding returned with the El Heraldo Radio programs retained. The Vox FM format was retooled from Contemporary hit radio in September 2022.

References

Radio stations in San Luis Potosí
Radio stations established in 1971
1971 establishments in Mexico